Sher Muhammad Baloch  is a Pakistani politician who was a member of the National Assembly of Pakistan from 2002 to 2013.

Political career
He was elected to the National Assembly of Pakistan from Constituency NA-258 (Karachi-XX) as a candidate of Pakistan Peoples Party (PPP) in 2002 Pakistani general election. He received 38,225 votes and defeated Abdul Hakeem Baloch.

He was re-elected to the National Assembly from Constituency NA-258 (Karachi-XX) as a candidate of PPP in 2008 Pakistani general election. He received 134,696 votes and defeated Nisar Ahmed Shar, a candidate of Muttahida Qaumi Movement (MQM).

References

Living people
Pakistani MNAs 2002–2007
Pakistani MNAs 2008–2013
Year of birth missing (living people)